Hal Landon Jr. (born May 23, 1941) is an American character actor. He is best known as Ted's father Captain Logan in the Bill & Ted film series.

Life
Landon was born May 23, 1941, in Long Beach, California the son of Hal Landon, and nephew of 1936 presidential election candidate Alf Landon. He is second cousin to Nancy Landon Kassebaum Baker.

He was a member of the South Coast Repertory in Orange County, California, most notably playing the role of Scrooge on stage from 1979 to 2019.

He continues to live in California.

Filmography

Film

Television

Other roles
L.A. Noire video game, as Oswald Jacobs

References

External links
 
 
 
 Rotten Tomatoes profile
 Hal Landon Jr. profile at SCR.org

Living people
1941 births
People from Long Beach, California
American male television actors
American male film actors
20th-century American male actors
21st-century American male actors